Graham Ralph Flight (born 1936) is a Canadian former politician, who represented the districts of Windsor-Buchans and Windsor-Springdale in the Newfoundland and Labrador House of Assembly.

Flight was born at Cottle's Island and was raised in Buchans, He was a teacher and also served as chair of the board of trustees for Buchans.

He was elected to the Newfoundland assembly as a member of the Liberal Party in 1975. Flight was reelected in 1979, defeated in 1982 and was elected again in 1985. He resigned his seat to allow Clyde Wells to run for a seat in the assembly in a 1987 by-election. He was reelected in 1989. Flight served in the provincial cabinet as Minister of Forestry and Agriculture.

References

Liberal Party of Newfoundland and Labrador MHAs
1936 births
Living people
People from Buchans
Members of the Executive Council of Newfoundland and Labrador